Paltapara, also Palta, is a census town in Barrackpore I CD Block of Barrackpore subdivision in North 24 Parganas district in the Indian state of West Bengal. It is a part of Kolkata Urban Agglomeration.

Geography

Location
Garshyamnagar, Noapara, Kaugachhi and Paltapara form an urban cluster east of Garulia and North Barrackpur. Ichhapur Defence Estate lies on the west of North Barrackpur.

96% of the population of Barrackpore subdivision (partly presented in the map alongside; all places marked on the map are linked in the full-screen map) lives in urban areas. In 2011, it had a density of population of 10,967 per km2 The subdivision has 16 municipalities and 24 census towns.

For most of the cities/ towns information regarding density of population is available in the Infobox. Population data is not available for neighbourhoods. It is available for the entire municipal area and thereafter ward-wise.

Police station
Noapara police station under Barrackpore Police Commissionerate has jurisdiction over Garulia and North Barrackpur municipal areas.

Post Office
Paltapara has a delivery branch post office, with PIN 743127 in the North Presidency Division of North 24 Parganas district in Calcutta region. Other post offices with the same PIN are Kowgachhi, Mulajore, Shyamnagar, Feeder Road, Gurdah, Mondalpara and Purbabidhyadharpur.

Demographics
 India census, Paltapara had a population of 6,408; of this, 3,293 are male, 3,115 female. It has an average literacy rate of 77.62%, higher than the national average of 74.04%.

Infrastructure
As per the District Census Handbook 2011, Paltapara covered an area of 1.7191 km2. Amongst the educational facilities it had were 4 primary schools, the nearest middle school was available 2 km away at Handia, the nearest secondary and senior secondary schools were available 2 km away at Ichhapur.

Transport
Paltapara is beside Kalyani Expressway.

The nearest railway stations are Shyamnagar railway station  and Ichhapur railway station on the Sealdah-Ranaghat line.

Healthcare
North 24 Parganas district has been identified as one of the areas where ground water is affected by arsenic contamination.

References

Cities and towns in North 24 Parganas district